Javier Hernán García (born January 29, 1987, in Buenos Aires) is an Argentine football goalkeeper who plays for Boca Juniors in the Argentine Primera División.

Club career

García started his professional career playing for Boca Juniors in the Argentine Primera División. He made his debut on August 24, 2008 in a 2–1 victory against Lanús.

In July 2011, García was loaned out to Tigre for 1 year.

International career
In 2007 García was part of the Argentina U-20 squad that won the FIFA U-20 World Cup, but he did not feature in any of the matches.

Honours
Boca Juniors
Primera División: 2008 Apertura, 2022
Copa Argentina: 2019–20
Copa de la Liga Profesional: 2020, 2022
Supercopa Argentina: 2022
Recopa Sudamericana: 2008

Racing Club
Primera División: 2018–19
Trofeo de Campeones: 2019

Argentina U20
FIFA U-20 World Cup: 2007

References

External links
 Statistics at Irish Times
  
 García, Javier Hernán at Historia de Boca.com 
 

Footballers from Buenos Aires
Argentine footballers
Argentine Primera División players
Boca Juniors footballers
Club Atlético Tigre footballers
Racing Club de Avellaneda footballers
Association football goalkeepers
Living people
1987 births
Argentina international footballers